"Satisfy You" is a song written by Janis Oliver and Don Schlitz, and recorded by American country music duo Sweethearts of the Rodeo.  It was released in April 1988 as the first single from the album One Time, One Night.  The song reached #5 on the Billboard Hot Country Singles & Tracks chart, the Sweethearts of the Rodeo's fourth best performance overall in the US charts for a single. As of December 2020, it has over one million views on its YouTube music video.

Charts

Weekly charts

Year-end charts

References

1988 singles
1988 songs
Sweethearts of the Rodeo songs
Songs written by Don Schlitz
Song recordings produced by Steve Buckingham (record producer)
Columbia Records singles